Chicoreus pisori is a species of sea snail, a marine gastropod mollusk in the family Muricidae, the murex snails or rock snails.

Description
The length of the shell attains 35.9 mm.

Distribution
This species occurs in the Pacific Ocean off Christmas Island.

References

 Houart, R., 2007. Chicoreus (Triplex) pisori n. sp. A new Muricine (Gastropoda: Muricidae) from Christmas Island, Pacific Ocean. Venus 65(4): 365-368

Gastropods described in 2007
Chicoreus